Sundar Singh Gurjar (born 1 January 1996 in Karauli, Rajasthan) is an Indian Paralympic javelin thrower, shot putter and discus thrower competing in F46 events. He won bronze medal at Tokyo 2020 Paralympics in men's javelin F46 event. He set a world record at the 16th Para Athletics National Championship in Panchkula holding three gold medals in three events. He is also recipient of Arjuna Award for Para-athletics.

Sport career 
In 2016 Sundar Singh Gurjar registered the 'A' qualification mark for the 2016 Rio Paralympics with a performance of 59.36m in 8th Fazza IPC Athletics Grand Prix, Dubai. He created a national record with 68.42m during the 16th Para Athletics National Championship in Panchkula. In 9th FAZZA IPC Athletics Grand Prix, Sundar Singh Gurjar won 3 Gold Medals in 3 Events -Javelin Throw, Shot Put and Discus Throw under the coaching of Mahaveer Prasad Saini. He won silver medal in javelin throw and bronze medal in discus throw in Asian Para Games 2018. In 2019, he won a gold medal at the 9th World Para Athletics Championships and in doing so, he not only defended his 2017 World Para Athletics Championships title but also became the only second Indian to have clinched two World Championships medals after Devendra Jhajharia.

On 30 August 2021, Sundar Singh won bronze medal in the men's javelin throw F46 event at 2020 Summer Paralympics along with Devendra Jhajharia (silver medal at the same event).

References 

1996 births
Living people
Paralympic athletes of India
Recipients of the Arjuna Award
Athletes (track and field) at the 2020 Summer Paralympics
Paralympic bronze medalists for India
Paralympic medalists in athletics (track and field)
Medalists at the 2020 Summer Paralympics
Indian male discus throwers
Indian male javelin throwers
Indian male shot putters
Medalists at the 2018 Asian Para Games